State Route 72 (SR 72) is a  state highway in the eastern portion of U.S. state of Tennessee. It travels through the towns of Vonore and Loudon.

Route description

Roane County

SR 72 begins in Roane County at an intersection with SR 58 just east of Midway. It then goes east as a narrow, curvy, 2-lane highway as it goes through Midway and then some mountains before entering Paint Rock and having a junction with SR 322, a loop route through Sweetwater. It stays curvy as it crosses more mountains and enters Loudon County.

Loudon County

It then begins paralleling the Tennessee River as it enters Loudon, and finally leaves the mountains and curves behind. SR 72 then has an interchange with I-75 before going through Loudon's main business district and having a junction with US 11/SR 2. It then bypasses downtown to the south before leaving Loudon and the Tennessee River to turn and go southeast. After that, it goes through farmland and has an intersection with SR 444 (Tellico Parkway), which provides access to Tellico Village, Tellico Lake, and Lenoir City.

Monroe and Blount Counties

SR 72 then crosses into Monroe County and enters Vonore, intersects with the other end of SR 322, and comes to an intersection with US 411/SR 33. It becomes concurrent with then and they travel east into downtown, where they intersect SR 360, which provides access to Fort Loudoun and Fort Loudoun State Park. They then cross the Little Tennessee River/Tellico Lake, before SR 72 separates and turns south. It then follows the banks of the lake, crossing into Blount County for a short distance, before ending at an intersection with US 129/SR 115 near Tallassee.

Junction list

See also

References

072
Transportation in Monroe County, Tennessee
Transportation in Blount County, Tennessee
Transportation in Loudon County, Tennessee
Transportation in Roane County, Tennessee